The Song to Her (Swedish: Sången till henne) is a 1934 Swedish comedy film directed by Ivar Johansson and starring Martin Öhman, Sickan Carlsson and Åke Jensen. It marked the film debut of Kristina Söderbaum, who went on to be a star of German cinema in the Nazi era.  It was also the first screen appearance of Norwegian actress Greta Gynt who went on to star in British films. The film was made at the Råsunda Studios in Stockholm and on location around the city including at the Royal Swedish Opera. The film's sets were designed by the art director Arne Åkermark.

Synopsis
A famous opera singer arrives for a special performance with the Stockholm ballet, leading to several ballerinas to swoon over him. He takes a fancy to one of them, Märta Holm, and she is town between him and her fiancée Arne.

Cast
 Martin Öhman as Carlo Martin
 Sickan Carlsson as 	Märta Holm
 Åke Jensen as 	Arne Wingård
 Greta Gynt as 	Kaj Klint
 Ernst Eklund as 	Harry Händel
 Eric Abrahamsson as 	Wig maker
 Nils Wahlbom as Piano tuner
 Nini Theilade as	Dancer at Rondo
 Charles Redland as Musician at Rondo
 Kristina Söderbaum as 	Guest at Rondo
 Tord Bernheim as 	Dancer at Rondo 
 Hugo Björne as 	Opera manager 
 Astrid Bodin as 	Cleaning-lady listening to Carlo Martin 
 Allan Bohlin as 	Arne's friend 
 Sonja Claesson as 	Märta's mother 
 Georg Fernqvist as 	Photographer at the railway station 
 Hjördis Petterson as 	Woman waiting outside The Opera 
 Lizzy Stein as 	Liva Landberg 
 Ilse-Nore Tromm as Dancer at Grand 
 Bullan Weijden as 	Cleaning-lady 
 Carl-Gunnar Wingård as 	Drunk gentleman at Rondo

References

Bibliography 
 Qvist, Per Olov & von Bagh, Peter. Guide to the Cinema of Sweden and Finland. Greenwood Publishing Group, 2000.

External links 
 

1934 films
Swedish comedy films
1934 comedy films
1930s Swedish-language films
Films directed by Ivar Johansson
Swedish black-and-white films
Films shot in Stockholm
Films set in Stockholm
1930s Swedish films